A leaf spring is a simple form of spring commonly used for the suspension in wheeled vehicles.  Originally called a laminated or carriage spring, and sometimes referred to as a semi-elliptical spring, elliptical spring,  or cart spring, it is one of the oldest forms of vehicle suspension. A leaf spring is one or more narrow, arc-shaped, thin plates which are attached to the axle and chassis in a way that allows the leaf spring to flex vertically in response to irregularities in the road surface. Lateral leaf springs are the most commonly used arrangement, running the length of the vehicle and mounted perpendicular to the wheel axle, but numerous examples of transverse leaf springs exist as well.

Leaf springs can serve multiple suspension functions: location, springing, and to some extent damping as well, through interleaf friction. However, this friction is not well controlled, resulting in stiction and irregular suspension motions. For this reason, some manufacturers have used mono-leaf springs.

Operation and basic design

A leaf spring takes the form of a slender arc-shaped length of spring steel of rectangular cross-section. In the most common configuration, the center of the arc provides location for the axle, while loops formed at either end provide for attaching to the vehicle chassis. For very heavy vehicles, a leaf spring can be made from several leaves stacked on top of each other in several layers, often with progressively shorter leaves. The longest leaf is also known as the main, master, or No. 1 leaf, with leaves numbered in descending order of length. The eyes at the end of the leaf spring are formed into the master leaf. In general, aside from the main leaf, the other leaves are tapered at each end. Sometimes auxiliary or rebound leaves are part of the main spring pack, in which case the auxiliary leaf closest to the main leaf is No. 1, the next closest is No. 2, etc. The leaves are attached to each other through the center bolt, which is at or near the mid-point along the length of the leaf spring. To ensure that leaves remain aligned laterally, several methods can be used, including notches and grooves between leaves or external clips.

Spring steels were discovered to be most efficient at approximately 1% carbon content. The material and dimensions should be selected such that each leaf is capable of being hardened to have a fully martensitic structure throughout the entire section. Suitable spring steel alloys include 55Si7, 60Si7, 65Si7, 50Cr4V2, and 60Cr4V2.

Characteristics

The two ends of a leaf spring usually are formed into round eyes or eyelets, through which a fastener connects each end of the spring to the vehicle frame or body. Some springs terminated in a concave end, called a spoon end (seldom used now), to carry a swiveling member instead. One eye is usually fixed translationally but allowed to pivot with the motion of the spring, whereas the other eye is fastened to a hinge mechanism that allows that end to pivot as well as undergo limited translational movement. A leaf spring can either be attached directly to the frame at both eyes or attached directly at one end, usually the front, with the other end attached through a shackle, a short swinging arm. The shackle takes up the tendency of the leaf spring to elongate when compressed and thus makes the suspension softer. The shackle provides some degree of flexibility to the leaf spring so that it does not fail when subjected to heavy loads. The axle is usually fastened to the middle of the spring by U-bolts.

The leaf spring acts as a linkage to hold the axle in position and thus separate linkages are not necessary. The result is a suspension that is simple and strong. Inter-leaf friction dampens the spring's motion and reduces rebound, which, until shock absorbers were widely adopted, was a very significant advantage over helical springs. However, because the leaf spring is also serving to hold the axle in position, soft springs—i.e. springs with low spring constant—are not suitable. The consequent stiffness, in addition to inter-leaf friction, makes this type of suspension not particularly comfortable for the riders.

Types

There are a variety of leaf springs, usually employing the word "elliptical". "Elliptical" or "full elliptical" leaf springs, patented in 1804 by the British inventor Obadiah Elliott, referred to two circular arcs linked at their tips. This was joined to the frame at the top center of the upper arc, the bottom center was joined to the "live" suspension components, such as a solid front axle. Additional suspension components, such as trailing arms, would usually be needed for this design, but not for "semi-elliptical" leaf springs as used in the Hotchkiss drive. That employed the lower arc, hence its name. 

"Quarter-elliptic" springs often had the thickest part of the stack of leaves stuck into the rear end of the side pieces of a short ladder frame, with the free end attached to the differential, as in the Austin Seven of the 1920s. As an example of non-elliptic leaf springs, the Ford Model T had multiple leaf springs over its differential that were curved in the shape of a yoke. As a substitute for dampers (shock absorbers), some manufacturers laid non-metallic sheets in between the metal leaves, such as wood.

Elliot's invention revolutionized carriage design and construction, removing the need for a heavy perch and making transportation over rough roadways faster, easier, and less expensive.

A more modern implementation is the parabolic leaf spring. This design is characterized by fewer leaves whose thickness varies from centre to ends following a parabolic curve. The intention of this design is to reduce inter-leaf friction, and therefore there is only contact between the leaves at the ends and at the centre, where the axle is connected. Spacers prevent contact at other points. Aside from weight-saving, the main advantage of parabolic springs is their greater flexibility, which translates into improved ride quality, which approaches that of coil springs; the trade-off is reduced load carrying capability. They are widely used on buses for improved comfort.

A further development by the British GKN company and by Chevrolet, with the Corvette, among others, is the move to composite plastic leaf springs. Nevertheless, due to the lack of inter-leaf friction and other internal dampening effects, this type of spring requires more powerful dampers/shock absorbers.

Typically when used in automobile suspension the leaf both supports an axle and locates/partially locates the axle. This can lead to handling issues (such as "axle tramp"), as the flexible nature of the spring makes precise control of the unsprung mass of the axle difficult. Some suspension designs use a Watts link (or a Panhard rod) and radius arms to locate the axle and do not have this drawback. Such designs can use softer springs, resulting in a better ride. Examples include the various rear suspensions of Austin-Healey 3000s and Fiat 128s.

History

The earliest known leaf springs began appearing on carriages in France in the mid-17th century in the form of the two-part elbow spring (as the illustrated example from Lisbon), and later migrated to England and Germany, appearing on the carriages of the wealthy in those countries around 1750. Dr. Richard Lovell Edgeworth was awarded three gold medals by the Society of English Arts and Manufacturers in 1768 for demonstrating the superiority of sprung carriages. By 1796, William Felton's A Treatise on Carriages and Harness showed that leaf springs were being marketed regularly by the late 18th century carriage industry.

Obadiah Elliot is credited with inventing the modern leaf spring with his 1804 patent on elliptical leaf springs, which brought him significant recognition and revenue, and engineers began studying leaf springs to develop improved designs and manufacturing processes. The mechanics and deflection of leaf springs were developed by Clark (1855), Franz Reuleaux (1861), and G.R. Henderson (1894). Improved steel rolling processes, process instruments, and spring steel alloys were developed during the latter half of the 19th century as well, making the manufacture of leaf springs more consistent and less expensive.

Leaf springs were very common on automobiles until the 1970s when automobile manufacturers shifted primarily to front-wheel drive, and more sophisticated suspension designs were developed using coil springs instead. Today leaf springs are still used in heavy commercial vehicles such as vans and trucks, SUVs, and railway carriages. For heavy vehicles, they have the advantage of spreading the load more widely over the vehicle's chassis, whereas coil springs transfer it to a single point. Unlike coil springs, leaf springs also locate the rear axle, eliminating the need for trailing arms and a Panhard rod, thereby saving cost and weight in a simple live axle rear suspension. A further advantage of a leaf spring over a helical spring is that the end of the leaf spring may be guided along a definite path. In many late 1990s and early 2000s trucks, the leaf spring is connected to a Hinkle Beam ball joint.

The leaf spring also has seen modern applications in cars. For example, the 1963 Chevrolet Corvette Sting Ray uses a transverse leaf spring for its independent rear suspension. Similarly, 2016 Volvo XC90 has a transverse leaf spring using composite materials for its rear suspension, similar in concept to the front suspension of the 1983 Corvette. This arrangement uses a straight leaf spring that is tightly secured to the chassis at the center; the ends of the spring are bolted to the wheel suspension, allowing the spring to work independently on each wheel. This suspension is smaller, flatter and lighter than a traditional setup.

Manufacturing process
Multi-leaf springs are made as follows

Pre heat treatment process:
Shearing
Taper Rolling
Trimming
End cutting & pressing
Second Warping
Scarfing and Eye rolling
Nipping
C’SKG punching
Center hole drilling.
Heat treatment processes:
Heating for hardening
Cambering
Quenching
Tempering
Post- heat treatment processes:
Rectification
Side bend removing
Bushing
Reaming
Clamp riveting
Assembly and surface finishes:
Shot peening
Painting
Assembling
Scragging
Marking and packing

Heat treatment

 Heating for Hardening: Any metal, or alloy which can be hard drawn, or rolled to fairly high strength and retains sufficient ductility to form, may be used for springs, or any alloy which can be heat treated to high strength and good ductility before, or after forming may be used. For special spring properties such as good fatigue life, nonmagnetic characteristics, resistance to corrosion, elevated temperatures and drift require special considerations. leaves are heated to critical temperature in an Oil-fired hardening furnace. Usually temperature maintained is between 850℃ and 950℃.
 Cambering: The top leaf is known as the master leaf. The eye is provided for attaching the spring with another machine member. The amount of bend that is given to the spring from the central line, passing through the eyes, is known as camber. The camber is provided so that even at the maximum load the deflected spring should not touch the machine member to which it is attached. The camber shown in the figure is known as positive camber. The central clamp is required to hold the leaves of the spring. Machine used for this operation is Hydraulic press. Leaves are bent to required radius using a press. All the leaves are tested for required radius using cambering gauges.
 Quenching : Hot bent leaves kept in tray and quenched in oil bath to get martensite structure. Martensite is the hardest form of steel crystalline structure. Martensite is formed in carbon steels by rapid cooling that is quenching of austenite form of iron. Machine used is conveyorized quench oil bath. Fire point of quenching oil is around 200℃ and it is seen to that  temperature of oil does not exceed 80℃. After quenching the structure of leaf spring becomes very hard and this property is not required. But this process is required to set the leaves to correct radius after cambering. To remove hardness tempering is done.
 Tempering: Tempering is a process of heat treating, which is used to increase the toughness. Quenched leaves are reheated to drop hardness to required level. Electric heated temperature furnace is used for this process. Hardness of the leaves is found out using Brinell hardness testing. This process is also done to relieve stresses. Temperature inside the machine is maintained between 540 and 680℃. Tempering process involves heating of leaves below their re-crystallization temperature and then cooling them using water or air.

Other uses

By blacksmiths

Because leaf springs are made of relatively high quality steel, they are a favorite material for blacksmiths. In countries such as India, Nepal, Bangladesh, Philippines, Myanmar and Pakistan, where traditional blacksmiths still produce a large amount of the country's tools, leaf springs from scrapped cars are frequently used to make knives, kukris, and other tools. They are also commonly used by amateur and hobbyist blacksmiths.

In trampolines

Leaf springs have also replaced traditional coil springs in some trampolines (known as soft-edge trampolines), which improves safety for users and reduces risk of concussion. The leaf springs are spaced around the frame as 'legs' that branch from the base frame to suspend the jumping mat, providing flexibility and resilience.

Clutches
The "diaphragm" common in automotive clutches is a type of leaf spring.

See also

 Bogie
 Carriage
 Car suspension
 Coil spring
 Corvette leaf spring
 Spring (device)
 Suspension lift
 Transverse leaf spring front suspension

References

External links

Springs (mechanical)
Automotive suspension technologies

de:Feder (Technik)#Biegefeder